Stjepan Vuković (born 20 January 1997) is a professional Croatian footballer who currently plays as a defender for NK Junak Sinj.

Club career

FK Senica
Vuković made his professional Fortuna Liga debut for FK Senica against FK Železiarne Podbrezová on May 24, 2019.

Junak Sinj
In September 2019, Vuković joined NK Junak Sinj.

References

External links
 FK Senica official club profile 
 
 Futbalnet profile 
 

1997 births
Living people
Footballers from Split, Croatia
Association football defenders
Croatian footballers
NK Dugopolje players
NK Mosor players
NK Uskok players
FK Senica players
NK Junak Sinj players
Slovak Super Liga players
First Football League (Croatia) players
Second Football League (Croatia) players
Croatian expatriate footballers
Expatriate footballers in Slovakia
Croatian expatriate sportspeople in Slovakia